The Puget Sound Electric Railway was an interurban railway that ran for 38 miles between Tacoma and Seattle, Washington in the first quarter of the 20th century.  The railway's reporting mark was "PSE".

Portions of the right-of-way still exist as multi-use trail through Milton, Washington, as well as from Pacific to Tukwila, Washington.

History 

The PSE began operations on September 25, 1902 with a line that started in downtown Tacoma, ran along Pacific and Puyallup Avenues, followed the course of present day Pacific Highway through Fife and to Milton, turned southeast towards Puyallup and paralleled the path of today's SR 167 through  Pacific, Algona, Auburn, Kent, Orillia and Renton, then into Seattle on its own dedicated right-of-way, via South Park, from there running on surface streets to the area near Pioneer Square. There it terminated at Occidental Way and Yesler Way in front of the Interurban Building, then known as the Pacific Block when the depot was located in the building's corner room from 1902 to 1928. From there it interchanged with other interurbans and street car lines in the area. At its peak the line saw 27 daily departures and arrivals split between the Tacoma and Renton branches with trains running from 7 in the morning to midnight.

Power was supplied via overhead wire in urban areas, and third rail in rural areas. The third rail was the cause of several accidents throughout the PSE's operations which involved livestock or people being electrocuted, and in some cases dead cows caused accidents involving the trolleys themselves.

The railroad ran for 26 years, until competition from trucks, buses, and automobiles on an ever-expanding road network, as well as the steam railroads, led to reduced ridership in the early 1920s and a decision to shut down operations was made by the operators. Despite protests, the interurban was allowed to suspend operations by a federal judge in a ruling made on October 13, 1928. The final trains ran on December 30, 1928. The rails were not pulled up until 1930.

It was headquartered in Kent, Washington.

Stations 

As of 1910.

Seattle (Yesler Way and Occidental Avenue)
Georgetown
Duwamish
Riverton
Foster
Tukwila
Renton Junction
Renton
Orillia
O'Brien
Kent
Thomas
Cristopher
Auburn
Algona
Pacific City
Edgewood
Milton
Tacoma (North Eighth Street & A Street)

Second life 
Portions of the PSE exist today as multi-use trails in Milton and linking Tukwila, Kent, Auburn, Algona, and Pacific in King County. The City of Edgewood's portion is currently in planning stages, with construction slated to begin in the Summer of 2011 and it is currently being/almost built as of 2021 10 years later.

See also 
 Yakima Valley Transportation Company
 Spokane and Inland Empire Railroad

References 

Defunct companies based in Tacoma, Washington
Railway companies established in 1902
Railway companies disestablished in 1928
Defunct Washington (state) railroads
Interurban railways in Washington (state)
Seattle metropolitan area
Transportation in Seattle
Transportation in Tacoma, Washington
Companies based in Kent, Washington
1902 establishments in Washington (state)
1928 disestablishments in Washington (state)